Jacob Senewell Yost (July 29, 1801 – March 7, 1872) was an American politician who represented Pennsylvania in the United States House of Representatives.

Early life and education 
Yost was born in Lower Pottsgrove Township, Montgomery County, Pennsylvania. He attended the common schools and Fourth Street Academy in Philadelphia.

Career 
He engaged in agricultural pursuits and served as publisher and editor of the La Fayette Aurora in La Fayette, Pennsylvania.

He was a member of the Pennsylvania House of Representatives from 1836 to 1839. Yost was elected as a Democrat to the Twenty-Eighth and Twenty-Ninth Congresses, serving from 1843 to 1847. He resumed a political position as the U.S. marshal for the Eastern District of Pennsylvania by appointment of President James Buchanan, serving from 1857 until his resignation in 1860.

Personal life 
Yost continued agricultural pursuits until his death in Pottstown, Pennsylvania, at the age of 70. He was interred in Edgewood Cemetery in Pottstown, Pennsylvania.

External links

 The Political Graveyard
 InfoPlease Biography

References 

1801 births
1872 deaths
Democratic Party members of the Pennsylvania House of Representatives
People from Montgomery County, Pennsylvania
Democratic Party members of the United States House of Representatives from Pennsylvania
19th-century American politicians